The 1994 Kilkenny Senior Hurling Championship was the 100th staging of the Kilkenny Senior Hurling Championship since its establishment by the Kilkenny County Board since 1887. The championship began on 23 July 1994 and ended on 9 October 1994.

Dicksboro entered the championship as the defending champions. Mullinavat were relegated from the championship after five seasons in the top flight.

On 9 October 1994, Tullaroan won the championship after a 1–06 to 0–06 defeat of Dicksboro in the final. It was their 20th championship title overall and their first title since 1958. It remains their last championship title.

Team changes

To Championship

Promoted from the Kilkenny Intermediate Hurling Championship
 John Locke's

From Championship

Relegated to the Kilkenny Intermediate Hurling Championship
 Clara

Results

First round

Relegation play-offs

Quarter-finals

Semi-finals

Final

Championship statistics

Top scorers

References

Kilkenny Senior Hurling Championship
Kilkenny Senior Hurling Championship